Lecco Maggianico is a railway station in Italy. Located on the Lecco–Milan railway, it serves the southern part of the municipality of Lecco as its secondary station.

Services
Lecco Maggianico is served by the line S8 of the Milan suburban railway service, operated by the Lombard railway company Trenord.

See also
 Milan suburban railway service

References

Railway stations in Lombardy
Milan S Lines stations
Railway stations opened in 1882